The Schenectady Locomotive Works built railroad locomotives from its founding in 1848 through its merger into American Locomotive Company (ALCO) in 1901.

After the 1901 merger, ALCO made the Schenectady plant its headquarters in Schenectady, New York.

One of the better-known locomotives to come out of the Schenectady shops was Central Pacific Railroad type 4-4-0 No. 60, the Jupiter (built in September 1868), one of two steam locomotives to take part in the "Golden Spike Ceremony" to celebrate the completion of the First transcontinental railroad. Although the original was scrapped in 1909, a full-scale, operating replica was completed in 1979, and now is part of an operational display at the Golden Spike National Historic Site.

Preserved Schenectady locomotives
Following is a list (in serial number order) of preserved Schenectady locomotives built before the ALCO merger. All locations are in the United States unless otherwise noted.

Gallery

See also
 General Electric Company, Schenectady, NY; headquarters and Locomotive Division
 List of locomotive builders

References

External links 

 Preserved Alco-Schenectady locomotive list

Defunct locomotive manufacturers of the United States
Schenectady, New York
 
Industrial buildings and structures in New York (state)
1901 mergers and acquisitions